The Field may refer to:
The Field (play), a 1965 play by John B. Keane
The Field (exhibition), 1968 Australian survey exhibition, National Gallery of Victoria
The Field (film), a 1990 film based on the play by John B. Keane
The Field (magazine), a field sports magazine published in England since 1853
The Field (musician), stage name of Axel Willner, Swedish electronic musician

See also
Field (disambiguation)
The Fields (disambiguation)